Emei Township is a rural township in Hsinchu County, Taiwan.

History
Emei Township was originally named Goeh-bai, taking the name from the curved crescent moon shape of the Emei Stream (峨眉溪).

Geography
 Area: 
 Population: 5,312 (February 2023)

Administrative divisions
 Emei Village
 Zhongcheng Village
 Shijing Village
 Qixing Village
 Fuxing Village
 Huguang Village

Tourist attractions
 Emei Lake
 Erliao Divien Tree
 Fuxing Old Street
 Mount Shitou
 Qixing Camphor Tree
 Qixing Tree
 Shierliao Leisure Agricultural Region
 Xi Mao Bu Hanging Bridge

Notable natives
 Chiu Ching-chun, Magistrate of Hsinchu County (2009–2018)
 Yang Wen-ke, Magistrate of Hsinchu County

References

External links

 

Townships in Hsinchu County